The 2009–10 Louisiana–Lafayette Ragin' Cajuns men's basketball team  represented the University of Louisiana at Lafayette during the 2009–10 NCAA Division I men's basketball season. The Ragin' Cajuns, led by first-year head coach Bob Marlin, played their home games at the Cajundome and were members of the West Division of the Sun Belt Conference. They finished the season 13–17, 10–8 in Sun Belt play to finish in a two-way tie for third place in the standings. They competed in the 2010 Sun Belt Conference men's basketball tournament where they lost in the Quarterfinals to Louisiana–Monroe. They were not invited to any other post-season tournament.

Immediately following the loss in the conference tournament, the university announced that Robert Lee's contract had not been renewed. Lee's overall cumulative record was 80–100 at Louisiana–Lafayette, which would be highlighted by the best single-season record at 15–15 despite the 2004–05 record of 20–11 along with a Sun Belt Tournament championship and an NCAA Tournament appearance, which were all vacated due to academic ineligibility of Orien Greene.

Roster

Schedule

|-
!colspan=9 style=| Regular Season

|-
!colspan=9 style=| 2010 Sun Belt Conference men's basketball tournament

References

Louisiana Ragin' Cajuns men's basketball seasons
Louisiana-Lafayette
Louisiana
Louisiana